Utah Airways is a commercial and private charter/tour airline based in Ogden, Utah.

History 
Utah Airways was started by two pilot friends to provide tours between Ogden and various national park locations. Operations began January 5, 2015. The airline also provides scheduled flights from Salt Lake City to Wendover, Utah. It added limited, unsubsidized service to Moab in October 2015, after SkyWest Airlines dropped the destination and Great Lakes Airlines failed to commence its proposed subsidized service.

Current destinations 
As of January 2016, Utah Airways destinations include:
 (Moab, Utah) Canyonlands Field
 (Ogden, Utah) Ogden-Hinckley Airport Hub
 (Salt Lake City, Utah) Salt Lake City International Airport
 (Wendover, Utah) Wendover Airport
 Las Vegas
 Los Angeles
 San Diego
 Phoenix
 San Francisco

Fleet 
As of January 2016, the Utah Airways fleet consists of the following aircraft:

References

External links 

Airlines established in 2015
Companies based in Ogden, Utah
2015 establishments in Utah
Airlines based in Utah
American companies established in 2015
Charter airlines of the United States
Regional airlines of the United States